PEMBEC High School (Pemberton Business and Enterprise College) was a state school in the Pemberton district of Wigan, Greater Manchester, with Business and Enterprise College status.

The school had a "Gifted and Talented" programme that had given it its highest number of pupils with A and A*s at GCSE.

PEMBEC was closed in August 2011, and the site is now named 'Central Park'.  Run by the Wigan Warriors rugby league club, Central Park offers vocational training and further education programmes for 14- to 19-year-olds. The provision also offers extensive facilities to be used by the local community as well as new headquarters for the club, a sophisticated base for the Warriors' Community and Foundation operations and a Centre of Excellence for the highly reputed Wigan Warriors' Youth Development Programme.

References

Defunct schools in the Metropolitan Borough of Wigan
Educational institutions disestablished in 2011
2011 disestablishments in England